The list of Triangle Fraternity brothers includes notable initiated members of Triangle Fraternity.

Athletics

Business

Education

Government

Military and uniformed services

Science and research

References

External links 
 Official Triangle Fraternity Website

Triangle
brothers